The following is a list of famous people born in Gisborne, New Zealand, and people who spent significant periods of their lives living in the Gisborne/East Coast area (from Wairoa to Te Kaha to Opotiki). Those in italic are people who weren't born in the Gisborne region but have/had spent a majority of their lives living in the region. Examples include cartoonist Murray Ball and former politician, Janet Mackey.

Media

Political

Art

Entertainment

Military

Sports

Business

Academics

Others

References

Gisborne